Henry Blair Johnson Taylor (1 June 1875 – 29 May 1903) was an Indian-born English sportsman who played both rugby union and first-class cricket for Cambridge University in the mid 1890s. He was born at Dalhousie in British India and died at Bengeo, Hertfordshire.

Taylor was the son of General Reynell Taylor and was educated at Newton College in Devon and at Jesus College, Cambridge. Arriving at Cambridge in 1894, he was picked and awarded a Blue for The Varsity Match rugby game against Oxford University in his first year, and again in 1896, appearing as a wing three-quarter back. His first-class cricket career as a right-handed middle-order batsman was all over within a week, and consisted of two matches for Cambridge University Cricket Club, both won by Cambridge by an innings, which meant that he had just two first-class innings and in them he made only three runs.

Taylor graduated from Cambridge University with a Bachelor of Arts degree in 1897. He became a schoolmaster, initially in Leamington, and then at Elstree School but left in 1901 to join the Paget's Horse regiment for the Second Boer War. Invalided home, he resumed his educational career as a master at Bengeo school, but died from pneumonia a year later.

References

1875 births
1903 deaths
English cricketers
Cambridge University cricketers
Alumni of Jesus College, Cambridge
Cambridge University R.U.F.C. players
Imperial Yeomanry officers
British Army personnel of the Second Boer War
Deaths from pneumonia in England